Altericroceibacterium endophyticum is a Gram-negative, rod-shaped and motile bacterium from the genus Altericroceibacterium which has been isolated from the plant Halimione portulacoides.

References

External links
Type strain of Altererythrobacter endophyticus at BacDive -  the Bacterial Diversity Metadatabase

Sphingomonadales
Bacteria described in 2017